Epilobium is a genus of flowering plants in the family Onagraceae, containing about 197 species. The genus has a worldwide distribution. It is most prevalent in the subarctic, temperate and subantarctic regions, whereas in the subtropics and tropics Epilobium species are restricted to the cool montane biomes, such as the New Guinea Highlands.

The taxonomy of the genus has varied between different botanists, but the modern trend is to include the previously recognised genera Boisduvalia, Pyrogennema and Zauschneria within Epilobium. Chamaenerion, (previously Chamerion), is considered distinct, however, according to Peter H. Raven, who has extensively studied the willowherbs and merges the other segregate genera into Epilobium. Fringed willowherb (Epilobium ciliatum) is likely a cryptic species complex; apparently these plants also commonly hybridize with their congeners.

Most species are known by the common name willowherbs for their willow-like leaves. Those that were once separated in Boisduvalia are called spike-primroses or boisduvalias. Those Epilobium species previously placed in the Chamaenerion group and known as fireweeds are now segregated into the genus Chamaenerion.

Description 

Epilobiums are mostly herbaceous plants, either annual or perennial; a few are subshrubs. The leaves are opposite or rarely whorled, simple and ovate to lanceolate in shape. The flowers are actinomorphic (radially symmetrical) with four petals that may be notched. These are usually smallish and pink in most species, but red, orange or yellow in a few. The fruit is a slender cylindrical capsule containing numerous seeds embedded in fine, soft silky fluff which disperses the seeds very effectively in the wind.

The genus name derives from the Greek words "epi" meaning "upon" and "lobos" meaning "lobe", with reference to position of the petals above the ovary.

A number of Epilobium species with slightly asymmetrical (zygomorphic) magenta flowers and alternate leaves were placed in a Chamaenerion group, and have been separated by some authorities into the genus Chamerion. However, Chamerion has not been universally accepted<ref name=TPL>{{cite web |url=http://www.theplantlist.org/tpl1.1/search?q=Chamerion |title=The Plant List: Chamerion |access-date=22 February 2017}}</ref> and there is now emerging consensus that this group of species should be segregated into the genus Chamaenerion.

Habitat and ecology
Willowherbs sensu lato are typically very quick to carpet large swathes of ground and may become key or dominant species of local ecosystems. In the United Kingdom, for example, rosebay willowherb (Chamaenerion angustifolium) is widely found on mesotrophic soils dominated by false oat-grass (Arrhenatherum elatius), cock's-foot grass (Dactylis glomerata), and red fescue (Festuca rubra), while great willowherb (Epilobium hirsutum) is found in mesotrophic grassland with stinging nettle (Urtica dioica). These two willowherb species also dominate open habitat early in ecological succession, to the virtual exclusion of other plant life. Broad-leaved willowherb (Epilobium montanum) is found characteristically, though not abundantly, in the mesotrophic grasslands with meadowsweet (Filipendula ulmaria) and sometimes the uncommon Greek valerian (Polemonium caeruleum). Most willowherbs will not tolerate shade trees and thus are limited to more recently disturbed patches, yielding to other plants over time. Consequently, though the genus contains many pioneer plants, rather few of them are invasive weeds of major importance.Epilobium species are used as food plants by the caterpillars of certain Lepidoptera species, including:
Geometridae
 Grey pug (Eupithecia subfuscata), recorded on several species
Noctuidae
 Mouse moth (Amphipyra tragopoginis), recorded on several species
 Small angle shades (Euplexia lucipara), recorded on several species
 Australian grapevine moth (Phalaenoides glycinae), recorded on fringed willowherb (E. ciliatum)
Sphingidae
 Elephant hawk-moth (Deilephila elpenor), recorded on several species
 Small elephant hawk-moth (Deilephila porcellus), recorded on several species
 White-lined sphinx (Hyles lineata), recorded on several species

Use by humans
The main use of Epilobium by humans is as a herbal supplement in the treatment of prostate, bladder (incontinence) and hormone disorders.
Many of the small willowherb species are nuisance weeds in gardens. Though few are regularly used as ornamental plants, the larger willowherbs may be attractive in ruderal locales. One of the most frequently recognized members of the genus is the circumboreal fireweed (E. angustifolium), known as rosebay willowherb in the United Kingdom. It rapidly colonizes burnt ground; during the bombing of London in World War II many of the derelict bomb sites were soon covered with these plants, bringing a splash of colour to what was otherwise a very grim scene. It is the floral emblem of Yukon in Canada, Hedmark in Norway (where it is called geitrams) and Southern Ostrobothnia in Finland.

Fireweed is used as a sweetener in northwestern North America. It is put in candy, jellies, ice cream, syrup, and sxusem ("Indian ice cream"). In the late summer its flowers yield pollen and copious nectar which give a rich spicy honey. Its young leaves, roots, and shoots are edible (if somewhat bitter), and rich in provitamin A and vitamin C. The Dena’ina found them also useful as food supplement for dogs and applied sap from the stem to wounds, believing it to have antiinflammatory properties.

Several researchers have studied this taxon. Heinrich Carl Haussknecht in the late 19th century and Peter H. Raven about a century later researched the phylogeny, systematics, and taxonomy of willowherbs. Peter Michaelis' studies of this genus paved the way for understanding of extranuclear inheritance in plants.

Species
The National Museum of Natural History recognizes an intermediate number of about 197 species in 10 sections, and consider the former section Chamaenerion (=Chamerion), as a distinct genus. Other sources may list one or two dozen species, more or less:

Section Boisduvalia
 Epilobium densiflorum – denseflower willowherb, dense spike-primrose, dense boisduvalia
 Epilobium pallidum – largeflower spike-primrose
 Epilobium pygmaeum – pygmy willowherb, smooth boisduvalia
 Epilobium subdentatum 
 Epilobium torreyi – Torrey's willowherb, brook spike-primrose

Section Cordylophorum
Subsection Nuttalia Epilobium suffruticosum  – shrubby willowherb
Subsection Petrolobium Epilobium nevadense  – Nevada willowherb
 Epilobium nivium  – Snow Mountain willowherb

Section Crossostigma
 Epilobium foliosum – leafy willowherb, California willowherb
 Epilobium minutum – chaparral willowherb, desert willowherb, smallflower willowherb

Section Epilobiopsis
 Epilobium campestre 
 Epilobium cleistogamum – selfing willowherb

Section Macrocarpa
 Epilobium rigidum – stiff willowherb, Siskiyou Mountains willowherb

Section Xerolobium
 Epilobium brachycarpum – tall willowherb, tall annual willowherb, tall fireweed, panicled willowherb
Section Zauschneria

 Epilobium canum – Zauschneria, California-fuchsia, hummingbird flower, hummingbird trumpet
 Epilobium septentrionale – northern willowherb, Humboldt County fuchsia

Section Epilobium
 Epilobium aitchisonii 
 Epilobium algidum 
 Epilobium alpinum Epilobium alpestre 
 Epilobium alsinifolium  – chickweed willowherb
 Epilobium alsinoides 
 Epilobium alsinoides ssp. alsinoides Epilobium alsinoides ssp. atriplicifolium 
 Epilobium alsinoides ssp. tenuipes 
 Epilobium amurense 
 Epilobium amurense ssp. amurense Epilobium amurense ssp. cephalostigma 
 Epilobium anagallidifolium – alpine willowherb, pimpernel willowherb
 Epilobium anatolicum 
 Epilobium anatolicum ssp. anatolicum Epilobium anatolicum ssp. prionophyllum 
 Epilobium angustum 
 Epilobium arcticum  – Arctic willowherb
 Epilobium astonii 
 Epilobium atlanticum 
 Epilobium australe 
 Epilobium barbeyanum 
 Epilobium billardierianum  – glabrous willowherb
 Epilobium billardierianum ssp. billardierianum Epilobium billardierianum ssp. cinereum 
 Epilobium billardierianum ssp. hydrophilum 
 Epilobium billardierianum ssp. intermedium 
 Epilobium blinii 
 Epilobium brevifolium 
 Epilobium brevifolium ssp. brevifolium Epilobium brevifolium ssp. trichoneurum 
 Epilobium brevipes 
 Epilobium brevisquamatum 
 Epilobium brunnescens  – New Zealand willowherb
 Epilobium brunnescens ssp. beaugleholei 
 Epilobium brunnescens ssp. brunnescens Epilobium brunnescens ssp. minutiflorum 
 Epilobium capense 
 Epilobium chionanthum 
 Epilobium chitralense 
 Epilobium chlorifolium 
 Epilobium ciliatum – fringed willowherb, American willowherb
 Epilobium clarkeanum 
 Epilobium clavatum – talus willowherb, clavatefruit willowherb
 Epilobium collinum 
 Epilobium coloratum  – purpleleaf willowherb
 Epilobium confertifolium 
 Epilobium confusum 
 Epilobium conjungens 
 Epilobium crassum 
 Epilobium curtisiae 
 Epilobium cylindricum 
 Epilobium davuricum  – Daurian willowherb
 Epilobium densifolium 
 Epilobium denticulatum 
 Epilobium detzneranum 
 Epilobium duriaei 
 Epilobium fangii 
 Epilobium fastigiatoramosum 
 Epilobium fauriei 
 Epilobium forbesii 
 Epilobium fragile 
 Epilobium frigidum 
 Epilobium fugitivum 
 Epilobium gemmascens 
 Epilobium glabellum  – smooth spike-primrose
 Epilobium glaberrimum – glaucous willowherb
 Epilobium glaciale 
 Epilobium glaucum 
 Epilobium gouldii 
 Epilobium gracilipes 
 Epilobium griffithianum 
 Epilobium gunnianum 
 Epilobium halleanum – glandular willowherb
 Epilobium hectorii 
 Epilobium hirsutum – great willowherb, great hairy willowherb, hairy willowherb, codlins-and-cream, apple-pie, cherry-pie
 Epilobium hirtigerum 
 Epilobium hohuanense 
 Epilobium hooglandii 
 Epilobium hornemannii  – Hornemann's willowherb
 Epilobium hornemannii ssp. behringianum 
 Epilobium hornemannii ssp. hornemannii Epilobium howellii – Yuba Pass willowherb, subalpine fireweed
 Epilobium indicum 
 Epilobium insulare 
 Epilobium kermodei 
 Epilobium keysseri 
 Epilobium kingdonii 
 Epilobium komarovianum  – bronzy willowherb
 Epilobium lactiflorum – milkflower willowherb, whiteflower willowherb
 Epilobium lanceolatum  – spear-leaved willowherb
 Epilobium laxum 
 Epilobium leiophyllum 
 Epilobium leptocarpum  – slenderfruit willowherb
 Epilobium leptophyllum – bog willowherb, linear-leaved willowherb
 Epilobium luteum  – yellow willowherb
 Epilobium macropus 
 Epilobium margaretiae 
 Epilobium matthewsii 
 Epilobium maysillesii 
 Epilobium melanocaulon 
 Epilobium microphyllum 
 Epilobium minutiflorum 
 Epilobium mirabile  – Olympic Mountain willowherb
 Epilobium montanum – broad-leaved willowherb
 Epilobium nankotaizanense  – Nankotaizan willowherb
 Epilobium nerteroides 
 Epilobium nivale 
 Epilobium nummulariifolium 
 Epilobium nutans 
 Epilobium obcordatum – rockfringe willowherb
 Epilobium obscurum  – dwarf willowherb, short-fruited willowherb
 Epilobium oreganum – Grants Pass willowherb, Oregon fireweed
 Epilobium oregonense – Oregon willowherb
 Epilobium pallidiflorum 
 Epilobium palustre – marsh willowherb
 Epilobium pannosum 
 Epilobium parviflorum  – small-flowered willowherb, hoary willowherb
 Epilobium pedicellare 
 Epilobium pedunculare  – rockery willowherb
 Epilobium pengii 
 Epilobium pernitens 
 Epilobium perpusillum 
 Epilobium petraeum 
 Epilobium pictum 
 Epilobium platystigmatosum 
 Epilobium ponticum 
 Epilobium porphyrium 
 Epilobium prostratum 
 Epilobium psilotum 
 Epilobium pubens 
 Epilobium puberulum 
 Epilobium purpuratum 
 Epilobium pycnostachyum 
 Epilobium pyrricholophum 
 Epilobium rechingeri 
 Epilobium rhynchospermum 
 Epilobium roseum  – pale willowherb
 Epilobium roseum ssp. consimile 
 Epilobium roseum ssp. roseum Epilobium roseum ssp. subsessile 
 Epilobium rostratum 
 Epilobium rotundifolium 
 Epilobium royleanum 
 Epilobium rupicolum 
 Epilobium salignum 
 Epilobium sarmentaceum 
 Epilobium saximontanum  – Rocky Mountain willowherb
 Epilobium sikkimense 
 Epilobium sinense 
 Epilobium siskiyouense – Siskiyou willowherb, Siskiyou fireweed
 Epilobium smithii 
 Epilobium staintonii 
 Epilobium stereophyllum 
 Epilobium stracheyanum 
 Epilobium strictum  – downy willowherb, stiff spike-primrose
 Epilobium subalgidum 
 Epilobium subcoriaceum 
 Epilobium subnivale 
 Epilobium taiwanianum 
 Epilobium tasmanicum 
 Epilobium tetragonum  – square-stemmed willowherb
 Epilobium tetragonum ssp. lamyi 
 Epilobium tetragonum ssp. tetragonum Epilobium tetragonum ssp. tournefortii 
 Epilobium tianschanicum 
 Epilobium tibetanum 
 Epilobium trichophyllum 
 Epilobium vernonicum 
 Epilobium wallichianum 
 Epilobium warakense 
 Epilobium wattianum 
 Epilobium williamsii 
 Epilobium willisii 
 Epilobium wilsonii 
 Epilobium × wisconsinense  – Wisconsin willowherb (=E. ciliatum ssp. ciliatum × E. coloratum)

 former Chamaenerion group
The following species are now segregated into the genus Chamaenerion Ség. The generic name Chamaenerion is preferred to Chamerion.)

Section Chamaenerion
 Epilobium angustifolium 
 Epilobium conspersum Epilobium latifolium Epilobium speciosumSection Rosmarinifolium
 Epilobium colchicum Epilobium dodonaei Epilobium fleischeri Epilobium steveniiFormerly placed here
 Stylidium tenellum (as E. tonkinense)

It is possible to distinguish between leaves of different Epilobium species using high-accuracy FT-IR method based on attenuated total reflection (ATR) without time-consuming preparation.

Footnotes

References
 Bleeker, Walter; Schmitz, Ulf & Ristow, Michael (2007): Interspecific hybridisation between alien and native plant species in Germany and its consequences for native biodiversity. Biological Conservation 137 (2): 248-253.  (HTML abstract, appendix reserved for subscribers)
 Steenkamp, V; Gouws, M.C; Gulumian, M; Elgorashi, E.E. & van Stade, J. (2006): Studies on antibacterial, anti-inflammatory and antioxidant activity of herbal remedies used in the treatment of benign prostatic hyperplasia and prostatitis. Journal of Ethnopharmacology'' 103 (1): 71–75.  PDF fulltext
 
 
 Wagner, W.L. & Hoch, P.C. [2009b]: Evening Primrose Family website – Epilobium. Retrieved 2009-JAN-26.

 
Onagraceae genera
Taxa named by Carl Linnaeus